Craig Van der Wath (born 28 June 1966 in Bloemfontein) is a South African professional squash player. He reached a career high of 21 in the world.  He represented his country in the Commonwealth Games. He has won the World Masters Squash Championships a record 6 times.

References

1966 births
Living people
South African male squash players
Alumni of Selborne College
20th-century South African people